Eduard Šedivý (born 4 January 1992) is a Slovak professional ice hockey defenceman who is currently playing for HC Košice of the Slovak Extraliga.

Career
He previously played for HK 91 Senica, MsHK Žilina, ŠHK 37 Piešťany and HK Dukla Michalovce. Šedivý has also played for the Slovak national team and participated at the 2017 IIHF World Championship.

Career statistics

Regular season and playoffs

International

References

External links

1992 births
Living people
Slovak ice hockey defencemen
People from Myjava
Sportspeople from the Trenčín Region
HK 91 Senica players
MsHK Žilina players
ŠHK 37 Piešťany players
HC Košice players
HC Slovan Bratislava players
Bratislava Capitals players
HK Dukla Michalovce players
Slovak expatriate ice hockey players in Canada